Jhalak Dikhhla Jaa 5 is the fifth season of the dance reality show, Jhalak Dikhhla Jaa. It premiered on 16 June 2012 on Colors and concluded on 30 September 2012. The series was hosted by Manish Paul and Ragini Khanna.

Contestants Status

Contestants & Choreographers

Original contestants
 Gurmeet Choudhary and Shampa Gopikrishna, winners on 30 September 2012
 Rashami Desai and Deepak Singh, second place on 30 September 2012
 Rithvik Dhanjani and Sneha Kapoor, third place on 30 September 2012
 Isha Sharvani and Salman Yusuff Khan, fourth place (quit) on 30 September 2012
 Bharti Singh and Savio Barnes, eliminated (quit) on 22 September 2012
 Karan Wahi and Mohena Singh, eliminated on 15 September 2012
 Darsheel Safary and Avneet Kaur, eliminated on 1 September 2012
 Shibani Dandekar and Punit Pathak, eliminated on 25 August 2012
 Giaa Manek and Nishant Bhat, eliminated on 18 August 2012
 Ravi Kishan and Kunjan, eliminated on 11 August 2012
 Sushil Kumar and Alisha Singh, eliminated on 4 August 2012
 Jayati Bhatia and Diwakar, eliminated on 28 July 2012
 Pratyusha Banerjee and Deepak Singh, eliminated on 21 July 2012
 Archana Vijaya and Sanam Johar, eliminated on 14 July 2012
 Sanath Jayasuriya and Suchitra Sawant, eliminated on 7 July 2012
 Talat Aziz and Ankita, eliminated on 30 June 2012

Wild cards (was not selected)
 Neha Bhasin and Cornel Rodrigues, Singer (did not get selected)
 Avika Gor and Sanam Johar, TV Actress who is seen in Sasural Simar Ka (not selected)
 Jay Soni and Bhavna, Actor who was last seen as Ishaan in Sasural Genda Phool (not selected)

Scoring Chart

green numbers indicates the highest score.
red numbers indicates the lowest score.
 indicates the winning couple.
 indicates the runner-up couple.
 indicates the second runner-up couple
 indicates the fourth-place couple
 the couple eliminated that week
 indicates the returning couple that finished in the bottom three.

Notes
 In Week 13, there was no elimination.
 From Week 14 onwards, those contestants in Bottom-Two would have to perform a dance-off and one would be eliminated and one saved based on Judges scoring alone.
 Week 15: In Week 14, Judges used VETO and Isha & Salman were to perform in Semi-finals directly due to injury thus that week they were not in the bottom two or bottom three.

 In the dance-off between Karan & Mohena and Rithvik & Sneha two of the judges Remo D'souza and Madhuri Dixit voted for Rithvik while another judge, Karan Johar, voted for Karan. Thus having the minority of votes Karan and his dancing partner and choreographer Mohena were eliminated.
 After being announced as one of the contestants for the bottom two with Rashmi, Bharti withdrew from the competition to protest Isha's stay on the show despite her being unable to deliver any performances for the last couple of weeks. Such a progression in the game according to her was not only unjust to other contestants but also violated the premises of fair play on which the competition should actually be based on.
 Isha was originally announced as a finalist for the title; however, due to persistent injuries she has faced, she withdrew from the competition and Rashmi, in turn, was given a place in the Grand Finale.

Averages 

This table only counts for dances scored on a traditional 30-points scale.

Wild Card Entry Special
1st Episode of Week 7 themed 'Wild Card' Special selected 3 new contestant to current participating celebrities.

Out of the 6 new Wild Card Entrance the couples which joined the current celebrities in the race of 'Jhalak' were
 Rashami & Deepak
 Rithvik & Sneha
 Karan & Mohena
 Selected Dance
 Rejected Dance

Dance chart 

The celebrities and professional partners danced one of these routines for each corresponding week:
 Week 1 : Introduction
 Week 2 : 100 Years of Indian Cinema
 Week 3 : Dance Attack
 Week 4 : Zodiac Signs
 Week 5 : Entertainment with Twist
 Week 6 : Judges' Challenge
 Week 7 : 'Superstar' Rajesh Khanna Special & Wild Card Entries
 Week 8 : Best Foot Forward
 Week 9 : Toofani Remix
 Week 10 : Famous Jodis of Bollywood [Individual Performance & Group relay]
 Week 11 : Colours & Childhood
 Week 12 : Kuch Hatke Dikha & Brahmastra

In Week 9, Isha's choreographer Salman sustained an injury during technical rehearsals and was thus unable to perform. Cornell, another dancing partner, performed with Isha in this episode. Cornell was the dancing partner of Neha Bhasin in the Wild Card Entry episode.

From the episode dated 2 September 2012 (Week 12) new choreographers were introduced and the celebrities and their professional partners (from Dancing with the Stars) danced one of these routines for the week 13 episode 25 (dated 8 September 2012):

 Week 13(Episode 25 [8 September 2012]): Firangi Tarka

 Week 13 (Episode 26 [9 September 2012]): Judges as Mentors ([Karan Johar's team: Isha and Karan], [Madhuri Dixit's Team: Rashmi and Gurmeet], [Remo's Team: Rithvik and Bharti])
 Week 14 (Episode 27 [15 September 2012] & Episode 28 [16 September 2012]): Breathless [Individual performances]; Performing in a group with back-dancers
 Week 15 (Episode 29 [22 September 2012]): Guest dancing partners

Week 13 episode 26 (dated: 9 September 2012) Rithvik's choreographer Sneha could not perform since she was suffering from typhoid thus another dancing partner Marischa Fernandes (JDJ 4 Winner choreographer) was roped in to perform with Rithvik.

Week 14: Salman, Isha's choreographer, performed on a Bollywood Dance form alone as Isha could not perform due to the elbow injury sustained in Week 12. There were no scores and the voting lines for Isha-Salman were not opened either. However, as per Judges ruling, Isha shall start performing from Week 15 (Semi-Final) onwards.

Week 15 (Episode 29 dated: 22 September 2012) contestants from previous Jhalak Dikhlaa Jaa seasons were invited as guest partners to perform with the remaining contestants Gurmeet, Bharti, Rashami and Rithvik. As Isha still had not recovered, she did not perform in that episode.
The performances were choreographed by the respective choreographers; however, contestants had the following guests as dancing partners:

Gurmeet performed with Gauahar Khan

Rashami performed with Meiyang Chang

Rithvik performed with Yana Gupta

Bharti was to perform with Mahhi Vij. However, she withdrew due to medical reasons at the beginning of the episode.

Semi-final, finale and grand-finale

 Week 15 (Episode 30 [23 September 2012]): Semi-Final (Solo and Group Relay performances)
 Week 16 (Episode 31 [29 September 2012] & Episode 32 [30 September 2012]): Finale & Grand Finale

 Highest scoring dance
 Lowest scoring dance
 Danced, but not scored

Highest and lowest scoring performances 
The best and worst performances of each team according to the judges' 30-point scale are as follows:

Controversies
TV Actress Gia Manek was replaced overnight from her show Saath Nibhaana Saathiya for participating in Jhalak Dikhhla Jaa.
 Stand-up Comedienne Bharti Singh who withdrew from the competition due to medical reasons on 22 September revealed that the real reason behind her quitting the show was to protest Isha's unfair stay on the dance contest. While standing against Rashmi in the bottom two, Bharti vehemently proclaimed that she sees her performances of no worth as she believes that the reality show has been rigged and Isha's continuous progression in the competition from week to week without delivering any performances is a visible proof that the contest is being plotted on unfair grounds.

Celebrity guests

Awards

References

External links
 Jhalak Dikhhla Jaa Official website

 

Jhalak Dikhhla Jaa seasons
2012 Indian television seasons
Colors TV original programming